This is a round-up of the 2006 Sligo Senior Football Championship. The reigning champions, Coolera/Strandhill, who were surprisingly eliminated at the group stage, after losing a playoff tie to neighbours St. John's. Geevagh won the 2006 Sligo Intermediate Football Championship with a victory over St Patrick's and therefore will take part in the 2007 Championship. Curry won the 2006 title, claiming their 6th title in all, by beating Bunninadden in the final.

Group stages

The Championship was contested by 16 teams, divided into four groups of four. The top two sides in each group advanced to the quarter-finals, with the remaining sides facing the Relegation playoffs to secure Senior status for 2007.

Group A

Group B

Group C

Group D

Playoffs

Two groups required playoffs to decide the remaining Quarter-Final places. In Group A St. Mary's, inspired by Mark Breheny, defeated Drumcliffe/Rosses Point to qualify to face Easkey in the last eight. The other playoff produced a major upset as holders Coolera/Strandhill crashed out, beaten by neighbours St. John's in the Group C playoff. Coolera had led by six points at one stage in the second half but St. John's scored two late goals, and booked a meeting with Curry in the quarter-finals.

Quarterfinals

The quarter finals of the Championship saw the exit of Tourlestrane, St. John's, Easkey and Tubbercurry. Eastern Harps, Curry, St. Mary's and Bunninadden qualified for the semi-finals. The quarter finals had one drawn game, Eastern Harps and Tourlestrane finishing level after a tense encounter. Harps won the replay a week later.

Semifinals

The semi-finals saw Curry and Bunninadden emerge victorious, and qualify for the 24 September decider. Bunninadden recorded a famous win over neighbours Eastern Harps, whom many expected to reach the final. In the second Semi-Final, Curry, with the Marren brothers, Jason and Adrian, both on form, saw off St. Mary's by a three-point margin.

Last eight

Sligo Senior Football Championship Final

Relegation
Due to the restructuring of the Senior Championship, in order to reduce the number of teams to 12 by 2009, two teams were to be relegated from the 2006 Championship, with one being promoted from the Intermediate ranks. The loser of each game progresses to the next round, the losers of the relegation finals will play in the Sligo Intermediate Football Championship in 2007. Coolaney/Mullinabreena and St. Molaise Gaels were the two sides that made the drop.

References

 Sligo Champion (Summer/Autumn 2006)
 Sligo Weekender (Summer/Autumn 2006)

Sligo Senior Football Championship
Sligo